The Rocky Island Historic District is a historic district in the Apostle Islands in Ashland County, Wisconsin. It is composed of the Hadland, Benson, Edwards, Nelson, and Erickson fish camps, which were located on the eastern shore of Rocky Island. The district represents the historical significance of commercial fishing on Lake Superior, which was primarily conducted by Scandinavian immigrants. The Rocky Island Historic District was added to the National Register of Historic Places on July 3, 2008.

Builders of the camps were Olaf Edwards, Christian Hadland, Charlie & Fred Benson, Julian Nelson, Mel & Martin Erickson, and others.

References

Geography of Ashland County, Wisconsin
Apostle Islands
Historic districts on the National Register of Historic Places in Wisconsin
National Register of Historic Places in Ashland County, Wisconsin
National Register of Historic Places in Apostle Islands National Lakeshore